Everything Will Be Okay (German: Alles wird gut) is a short film written and directed by Patrick Vollrath.

The movie was nominated for the Academy Award for Best Live Action Short Film at the 88th Academy Awards.

Plot
A divorced father (Michael Baumgartner) picks up his daughter (Lea) for the bimonthly weekend visit. Everything seems normal until Lea starts to understand that her father intends to take her out of the country and away from her mother. Their flight gets cancelled, which forces them to stay at the airport hotel for the next night. Lea is able to contact her mother who calls the police. The next morning Lea is united with her mother.

Credits 
Director/Editor/ Producer: Patrick Vollrath

Director of Photography: Sebastian Thaler

Awards and nominations

References

External links

 
 

2015 films
Austrian short films
2010s German-language films
2015 drama films
2015 short films
Austrian drama films